H